Kirovsk may refer to:
Kirovsk, Russia, several inhabited localities in Russia
Kirovsk, Luhansk Oblast, a city in Luhansk Oblast, Ukraine
Kirovsk, former name of the town Zarichne in Lyman Raion of Donetsk Oblast, Ukraine
Kirawsk (Kirovsk), a town in Belarus

See also
Kirov (disambiguation)
Kirovske (disambiguation)
Kirovsky (disambiguation)
Kirovka (disambiguation)
Kirovo (disambiguation)